Zhang Yue may refer to:

 Zhang Yue (Tang dynasty) (張說, 663–730), Chinese official of the Tang dynasty
 Zhang Yue (PRC politician) (张越, born 1961), former Chinese politician, who served as Secretary of the Political and Legal Affairs Commission of Hebei
 Zhang Yue (张跃), Chinese businessman and chairman of Broad Group in Hunan, China
 Zhang Yue (host) (张越, born 1965), Chinese female TV host, who serves in China Central Television
Zhang Yue (materials scientist) (born 1958), Chinese academic
 (张月, born 1994), Chinese actor

Sportspeople
 Zhang Yue (footballer, born 1990) (张越), Chinese female football goalkeeper
 Zhang Yue (figure skater) (张悦, born 1993), Chinese female pair skater
 Zhang Yue (footballer, born 1999) (张越), Chinese male football defender